Mancunian (or Manc) is the accent and dialect spoken in the majority of Manchester, North West England, and some of its environs. It is also given to the name of the people who live in the city of Manchester.
It has been described as 'twangy' whilst also being labelled 'euphonic' and has been voted as sexiest accent in England. Additionally it has been claimed Mancunian is one of the most desirable and friendliest accents in the UK.

Manchester Metropolitan University produced an accent map of Greater Manchester and the accents of Manchester and Salford were described as 'diverse', 'rough', 'common' and the word 'scally' was also used as a description.

It is claimed that the Manc dialect of British English has subconsciously changed the way people from the other English-speaking UK regions talk through the British popular culture of television shows such as Coronation Street and later rock bands such as Oasis, New Order, Happy Mondays, The Fall and The Stone Roses who all had distinct Manchester accents.

An article from The Guardian newspaper explained that:

History 

Manchester was the birthplace of the Industrial Revolution and at the start of the 18th century had a population of around 10,000 but by start of the 20th century had a population of around 700,000 The history of Manchester shows that from the Industrial Revolution onwards the city was settled by migrants from many countries but notably from Ireland and other areas of the United Kingdom, Eastern Europe, Italy and Germany. In modern times greater numbers have arrived from the Indian Subcontinent and the West Indies. It is argued that Manchester today is the second most polyglot city after London subsequently creating a melting pot of languages, accents and dialects. It is unclear when the Mancunian accent separated from the Lancashire accent but it is argued an evolving and cosmopolitan city with lots of different immigrant groups, Manchester has developed a twang which has set it aside from surrounding areas in Lancashire. The Manchester accent is said to have been influenced greatly by its neighbouring twin city of Salford, which was the home to Manchester Docks and could further explain the creation and emergence of an accent very different from other nearby towns. The accent could have extended further and became more widespread in the immediate locality through popular culture during the Madchester era.

Dialect 

The speech of the city of Manchester has never been the subject of an in-depth study. However, starting in September 2019, a team at Manchester Metropolitan University under Rob Drummond has been investigating accents, dialects and identities across Greater Manchester, with an "Accent Van" travelling around the area to interview residents. Results are due in Spring 2022. Speaking on BBC Radio Manchester on 25 March 2021, Rob Drummond said that the area had a particularly broad range of dialects as a result of migrations of people from different areas of the country and the world to specific locations. Prior to modern times the early dialectologist Alexander John Ellis included the city in his survey of English speech, and placed most of Greater Manchester (excluding the Bolton and Wigan areas) in his 21st dialect district, which also included north-west Derbyshire. In the 1982 textbook Accents of English, John C. Wells makes some comments on the Manchester dialect, which he describes as being "extremely similar" to the dialect of Leeds. Throughout the 19th century and for most of the 20th century, speech in Manchester was considered part of the Lancashire dialect. Many of the dialect poets of the 19th century came from Manchester and the surrounding area. In the early 20th century, the Manchester Ballads featured Lancashire dialect extensively. As many of the traditional dialect features have died out in Manchester, it has been seen by some in recent years as a separate dialect. In Peter Trudgill's book The Dialects of England, it was classified as part of the "Northwest Midlands" dialect region.

The similarities with accents and dialects of nearby cities and towns has, in recent years, been argued against however. Even within the locality of Greater Manchester it is apparent that a separate Mancunian accent and dialect has emerged with it being noted there are four separate dialects categorised as 'Manc', 'Posh', 'Lancashire' and 'Wigan'.

Geographical coverage 

The Manchester accent is relatively localised, and is usually found in Greater Manchester including the cities of Salford and Manchester and also in the immediately adjacent parts of the boroughs of Bury, Oldham, Rochdale, Stockport, Tameside and Trafford. It is also prominent in "overspill" towns and estates such as Hattersley, Gamesley, Handforth and Birchwood. The famous Manc twang is heard in areas of Central Manchester and neighbouring Salford whilst northern areas of Greater Manchester associate more with traditional Lancashire. The derogatory term 'Yonner' was originally used to describe people from Oldham & Rochdale who spoke with a thick Lancashire accent. It is now often used to describe anyone from the northern boroughs of Greater Manchester who speak with a Lancashire accent.

The dialect itself is more distinctive than many people realise. It is quite noticeably different from the accent spoken in adjacent towns such as Bolton, Oldham, Rochdale and Wigan despite them being within Greater Manchester. The Mancunian accent is less dialect-heavy than neighbouring Lancashire and Cheshire accents, although words such as owt (meaning 'anything') and nowt (meaning 'nothing') remain part of the Mancunian vocabulary.

Particularly strong examples of the accent can be heard spoken by Davy Jones of The Monkees who was born in Openshaw, Mark E. Smith (Salford-born, Prestwich-raised singer with The Fall), the actor John Henshaw (from Ancoats) and Liam and Noel Gallagher from Burnage band Oasis. The actor Caroline Aherne (raised in Wythenshawe) spoke with a softer, slower version of the accent. Stretford-raised Morrissey like many Mancunians, from an Irish background has a local accent with a noticeable lilt inherited from his parents. Salford-born Tony Wilson retained his Mancunian accent, albeit somewhat modified by his upbringing in Marple and his Cambridge education. Salford poet John Cooper Clarke is another example of a working-class Mancunian accent as can be heard in his spoken-word recordings. Also from Salford is comedian Jason Manford, whose Manc accent adds to his comedic style. Other notable Manc speakers include boxer Ricky Hatton (from Hattersley, Hyde) and the actor Bernard Hill (from Blackley). Dominic Monaghan speaks with a notable Manc accent, and his characters in both Lost and FlashForward have made note of it. Less well known outside of the area, and with pronounced local accents, are local broadcasters Eamonn O'Neal, Mike Sweeney and Jimmy Wagg. The TV broadcaster Terry Christian (from Old Trafford) has a particularly prominent voice. The Mancunian accent is prominent in the locally-set TV series Shameless, The Street and The Royle Family. The character Jack Regan in the 1970s police drama The Sweeney (played by Longsight-born actor John Thaw) is a Mancunian with an accent heavily modified by years of living in London. Another example of a Mancunian speaker is Karl Pilkington, a radio and TV personality.

Manchester's most famous soap opera Coronation Street has, despite being based in the city (a fictionalised version of Salford), less pronounced Mancunian accents than other TV shows set in the area. Several of the show's cast members do speak with pronounced Mancunian accents in the series. They include Michelle Keegan (Tina), Helen Flanagan (Rosie Webster) and Simon Gregson (Steve McDonald). The West Sussex-raised British actress, Jane Leeves, portrayed the character of Daphne Moon, a Manchester emigrant to Seattle with a supposed Mancunian accent which was actually much closer to a broad Lancashire dialect, in the American sitcom Frasier.

Phonology 

The dialect is distinguishable from other Northern English dialects. A major feature of the Mancunian accent is the over-enunciation of vowel sounds when compared to the flattened sounds of neighbouring areas. Manchester received a large number of immigrants during the Industrial Revolution, notably from Ireland, which apparently has affected the accent of the city creating a sound different to immediately neighbouring areas. Traditionally, the Manchester area was known for glottal reinforcement of the consonants , similar to modern speech in the north-east of England. More recent research has found that /t/ most often undergoes full glottal replacement, being realised as a glottal stop [ʔ] rather than as an alveolar plosive with glottal fortification [ʔt], in a process known as t-glottalisation.

The city of Manchester and most other areas of Greater Manchester, such as Stockport and Wigan, are non-rhotic, meaning /r/ is not pronounced unless followed by a vowel. A few parts of Greater Manchester north of the city proper, for example Rochdale, may exhibit some residual rhoticity, though this has been continuously and increasingly declining due to non-rhoticity now spanning the bulk of urban Lancashire (Greater Manchester included).

H-dropping, i.e. the omission of the sound /h/ (e.g. pronouncing head as [ɛd] rather than [hɛd]), is common in speakers of Manchester English, especially among the working class population. Th-fronting, i.e. pronouncing the dental fricatives /θ, ð/ as labio-dental [f, v] (e.g. pronouncing both three and free as free), is also found in Manchester, especially in younger speakers and among working-class men.

Manchester English has also been described as having so-called "dark" (i.e. velarised) /l/ in both onset and coda position (i.e. at the beginning and end of a syllable, e.g. in leap and peel), though some speakers may still have a less dark onset than coda /l/.

Like all Northern English accents, Mancunians have no distinction between the STRUT and FOOT vowels or the TRAP and BATH vowels. This means that but and put are rhymes, as are gas and glass (which is not the case in the south of England).

The unstressed vowel system of Manchester, i.e. the final vowels in words such as happY and lettER, are often commented on by outsiders. Phonetically, both vowels are lowered and backed. This means that the final vowel in happY sounds more like the vowel in DRESS (rather than the vowel in KIT like many Northern accents or the vowel in FLEECE like many southern English accents) and the final vowel in lettER is often perceived as being similar to the vowel in LOT (although this has been found to be a slight exaggeration of the true pronunciation).

The GOAT and GOOSE vowels show socioeconomic variation in Manchester but in different directions. A fronter GOAT vowel is positively correlated with higher social classes whereas GOOSE is stable across all social classes except before /l/, where a fronter GOOSE is correlated with lower social classes.

Another notable aspect of the phonology of Manchester English is "velar nasal plus" or the retention of [ɡ] after [ŋ] (where it has been lost in almost all other modern varieties of English), such that the words singer and finger rhyme for Manchester speakers, both having a medial [ŋɡ] cluster. Word-final ng clusters likewise often retain the plosive (or are otherwise reduced simply to [n] or sometimes [ŋ]), especially before a pause, where ejective [kʼ] is not an uncommon allophone.

A further trait of Manchester English, especially among younger residents, is the pronunciation of /s/ before /tɹ, tj, tʃ/ as [ʃ] in words such as street, district, stupid, moisture and mischief. This is a phenomenon known as /s/-retraction and is also found in various other varieties of English.

Manchester Voices created heat maps of the Greater Manchester area and highlighted key differences between the accents of Manchester, Salford, Trafford, Stockport and Tameside in comparison to the northern boroughs of Wigan, Bolton, Bury, Rochdale and Oldham. Examples of differences include the word "bear" pronounced as "burr" and "bus" pronounced "buz" in the northern boroughs where a Lancashire accent is spoken as opposed to a more Mancunian accent in the southern boroughs.

Vocabulary 

Here are some of Mancunian's most notable dialectical words, phrases and sayings. These are not used by the entire population:
  – nasty, disgusting (e.g. '')
 bobbins – Rubbish, worthless. Used in place of an expletive when children are present.
 buzzing – extremely happy 
 cock – Generic term of friendship, like mate or pal.
 dead – an emphasis marker (e.g. 'dead busy' and 'dead friendly'.)
 the dibble – refers to the police
 gaff – a residence, house or flat
 ginnel – an alleyway, especially when passing beneath a building
 madferit (Mad for it) – full of enthusiasm, a phrase that embodied the Madchester era
 mither – 	To moan or to whinge. To irritate or annoy. To bother.
 muppet – ignorant, foolish
 our kid – Term of endearment for a sibling or close acquaintance.
 safe – to be on good terms, also used to mean 'okay' and as a greeting
 sayin(g) – contraction of 'what are you saying?', now used as a greeting, via sense of 'what are you up to?'
 sappnin(g) – contraction of 'what's happening?', now used as a greeting, via sense of 'what are you up to?'
 scran – food (also used in Liverpool and Glasgow and Newcastle)
 scrote – refers to someone worthless or unpleasant; a low-life (Short for scrotum).
 snide – Mean, tight.
 sorted – okay/dealt with (Sorted out)
 sound – okay, trustworthy

Spoken Word performer and poet Argh Kid (David Scott) breaks down Mancunian vocabulary in his piece "Nanna Calls Me Cock".

Notes

Bibliography

Further reading 

 

British English
Culture in Manchester
English language in England
City colloquials